Drechslera teres f. maculata is a plant pathogen.  It is a form of the species Drechslera teres.

References

External links
 USDA ARS Fungal Database

Fungal plant pathogens and diseases
Pleosporaceae
Forma taxa